Chef in Your Ear is a Canadian cooking competition television series, that premiered on Food Network Canada on August 31, 2015.

Hosted by Greg Komorowski, each episode of the series features a competition between two professional chefs who must "compete without cooking", by providing remote direction to an absolutely clueless cook. Using only a video monitor to watch the amateur's actions and a microphone to communicate direction into an earpiece, the chefs must guide the amateurs through the process of preparing a restaurant-quality meal in one hour.

The competing professional chefs are Jordan Andino, Devin Connell, Craig Harding, Rob Rossi and Cory Vitiello.

The series was purchased by Food Network Canada in December 2014, and production formally began in April 2015.

References

2015 Canadian television series debuts
2016 Canadian television series endings
2010s Canadian reality television series
Television shows filmed in Toronto
Food Network (Canadian TV channel) original programming
Cooking competitions in Canada
2010s Canadian cooking television series
Food reality television series
Television series by Corus Entertainment